is a Japanese voice actress and a former singer. Hasegawa started her career as a member of the idol girl group NGT48 in 2015, debuting as a regular member of the group's Team NIII. In 2018, she was transferred to Team G, which later merged with Team NIII to become a unified first generation in 2019. On May 18, 2019, she left the group to pursue voice acting.

Early life

From her fourth year in elementary school to her third year in middle school, Hasegawa played baseball on a co-ed team, in which she served as second baseman. After leaving the school's baseball club, she subsequently joined into the track and field group, where she received offers from over 10 different schools as a result of her achievements.

Career

Music career

Hasegawa auditioned for AKB48's then-upcoming Niigata-based sister group, NGT48, having been fascinated with idols after she watched AKB0048. After passing the audition for the group's first generation on July 25, 2015, at the opening show of NGT48's theater on January 10, 2016, she debuted as a regular member of the newly established Team NIII. As part of NGT48, she subsequently made her major label debut on April 12, 2017, with the single "Seishun Dokei." In 2018, Hasegawa appeared in the live-action film adaptation of the novel Midnight Bus. She was later transferred to the group's newly established Team G. She also participated in the South Korean reality competition series, Produce 48, representing NGT48 with Team NIII's Noe Yamada. Hasegawa was eliminated during the first round and finished at 71st place.

In 2019, after Team G co-captain Maho Yamaguchi was forced by the NGT48 management to apologize for publicly alleging that she was assaulted in December 2018, Hasegawa removed "NGT48" off her social media profiles to show support. The NGT48 management responded by merging Team NIII and Team G together into a "first generation" group, with their final performances as their original teams on April 21, 2019. During Team G's performance on April 21, Hasegawa, along with Riko Sugahara, announced her decision to graduate from NGT48 in solidarity with Yamaguchi. Hasegawa held a final performance with Yamaguchi and Sugahara on May 18, 2019.

Voice acting career and other post-graduation activities

During Hasegawa's graduation speech, she announced she was pursuing voice acting. On June 10, 2019, Hasegawa announced that she signed with Crocodile Ltd. with the help of Yasushi Akimoto. She took voice acting lessons from the sound company BloomZ. She was first assigned as the PR reporter for the second season of Dropkick on My Devil! and later made her voice acting debut as Konomi Seki on Sapporo Otome Gohan.

Since its inception in 2019, Hasegawa also participated in the cross-media project Idol Bu Show, playing the part of the character Kokoro Kakegawa in the correlated radio drama shows and events, among other things, and taking part in the productions of two CD albums as part of the in-story unit X-UC: Current Xanadu, released on January 8, 2020, and Papier Mache Idol, released on October 7, 2020.

This was later followed up in with yet another participation, announced in June 2020, in another cross-media project: Denonbu, produced by Bandai Namco. In it, Hasegawa plays the role of the character Shian Inubousaki.

As a Vtuber, ever since 2019 Hasegawa has been providing voice and movements for the official mascot of the Daiei supermarket group, Mokkun, in the children educational videos published regularly on the mascot's YouTube channel.

A native of Tainai, Hasegawa had been serving since September 2019 also as a tourism PR ambassador for the city to engage in promotional campaigns and events for it, with her appointment being renewed over the subsequent years.

Discography

Songs within NGT48

Songs within Idol Bu Show

Songs within Denonbu

Songs within Tokyo 7th Sisters

Filmography

Live-action

Radio

Television

Theater

Film

Voice acting

Television anime

Anime movies

Video games

Movie dubbing

Drama series dubbing

Cross-media productions

Photobooks

References

External links
 

21st-century Japanese actresses
2001 births
Japanese film actresses
Japanese voice actresses
Voice actresses from Niigata Prefecture
Living people
NGT48 members
Produce 48 contestants
VTubers